Simplex Manufacturing Corporation was an American manufacturer that made motorcycles from 1935 to 1975. Between 1935 and 1960, Simplex made variations of the Simplex Servi-Cycle including the 1953–1960 Simplex Automatic. Simplex was the only motorcycle manufacturer located in the Deep South for many years, until Confederate Motorcycles began production.

History
Simplex was founded by Paul Treen (father of United States Congressman and Louisiana Governor David Conner Treen) in New Orleans, Louisiana in the late 1920s with an initial investment of $25. Treen had been a dealer in Harley-Davidson motorcycles and had pitched them the idea of making a lightweight motorcycle for young riders. When Harley-Davidson rejected the idea, Treen decided to enter the market himself and designed his Servi-Cycle. The Simplex Servi-Cycle was introduced in 1935.

Although Simplex Manufacturing Corporation produced motorcycles for over 20 years, the last Simplex Automatics looked almost the same as the company's original 1935 Simplex Servi-Cycle motorcycle.  Paul Treen would often visit the factory's tool shop and work with the engineers on new ideas himself,  resulting in continuous improvements to Simplex products instead of annual new model introductions.

Western Auto sold Simplex motorcycles under the Wizard brand in the mid-1950s.

Simplex's minimalist philosophy was maintained throughout the company's history, whose designs changed little after 1935. By the 1950s Simplex's designs were primitive, leading to the end of Servi-Cycle and Automatic production in 1960. Simplex continued to make minibikes and karts using proprietary small engines until 1975, when Simplex went out of business.  Treen had sold the company three years earlier, in 1972.  Simplex was the only motorcycle manufacturer located in the American South.

A 1935 Simplex Servi-Cycle motorcycle is currently on display in the Smithsonian Institution's America on the Move exhibit.

Engine
The two-stroke engine had a rotary valve and an "overhung" crankshaft with only one main bearing.   A kick-starter was added by 1953.

The Servi-Cycle used a magneto of Simplex's own design, providing 6 volt electricity for the dual ignition and for the headlight, taillight and stoplight.  The engine had dual spark plugs in its cylinder head.

Transmission
The original Servi-Cycle design had the engine drive the rear wheel by belt, with no transmission or clutch, requiring the engine to be shut off while the cycle is at rest. In 1941, a pedal-operated clutch was added.

By 1950, Simplex added a belt-type automatic transmission.  The ratio was changed by expanding and contracting the drive pulley, with a low ratio of approximately 18:1 and a high ratio of approximately 7:1.  The transmission was belt-driven and drove the real wheel by belt, with automatic belt tensioning by jockey pulley.

Simplex Automatic scooter
In 1956, Simplex began manufacturing a scooter based on the Simplex Automatic drivetrain.  The scooter was not made in large numbers and was discontinued in 1960 along with the Servi-Cycle.

References

External links 
 HowStuffWorks 1956 Simplex Automatic
 1957 Simplex Automatic article from American Motorcyclist, July 1994
 You Can Ride the Simplex Automatic article as printed in Cycle magazine copyright February 1956
 Motorbiking the Simplex Way article from Walneck's Classic Cycle Trader, October 1995

Defunct motorcycle manufacturers of the United States
Vehicle manufacturing companies established in 1935
Vehicle manufacturing companies disestablished in 1960
Defunct manufacturing companies based in Louisiana